Metachanda anomalella is a moth in the oecophorine tribe Metachandini. It was described by Pierre Viette in 1957. Its type locality is on Réunion.

References

Oecophorinae
Moths described in 1957
Taxa named by Pierre Viette
Moths of Réunion